Alice Through the Looking Glass (1966), was a live action musical film made for television, directed by Alan Handley, and based on Lewis Carroll's 1871 novel Through the Looking-Glass. The show aired November 6, 1966 on NBC television in the United States. Bob Mackie and Ray Aghayan worked together on the costume designs, which won them an Emmy Award in 1967.

Cast 
 Judi Rolin as Alice
 Roy Castle as Lester the Jester
 Robert Coote as The Red King
 Jimmy Durante as Humpty Dumpty
 Agnes Moorehead as The Red Queen
 Jack Palance as Jabberwock
 Dick Smothers as Tweedledee
 Tom Smothers as Tweedledum
Iris Adrian as Tiger Lily
Ricardo Montalban as The White King
Nanette Fabray as The White Queen

See also 
 Films and television programmes based on Alice in Wonderland

References

External links
 

1966 television specials
American musical films
Films based on Alice in Wonderland
1960s English-language films
1960s American films